.

Career
Agarwal studied in Agarwal Intermediate College at Allahabad and became Law graduate from Allahabad University. After the advocate's enrollment in 1956 he practiced in Civil and constitutional matters in the Allahabad High Court. Since 1970 he worked as Chief Standing Counsel of the State Government. He was the Editor of the Allahabad Law Journal. Agarwal was appointed additional Judge of Allahabad High Court on 6 August 1973. He was transferred as Chief Justice of Rajasthan High Court on 15 April 1990 and in 1994 he became the Chief Justice of the Calcutta High Court. Justice Agarwal retired on 15 January 1996.

References

1934 births
University of Allahabad alumni
Judges of the Allahabad High Court
Chief Justices of the Rajasthan High Court
Chief Justices of the Calcutta High Court
20th-century Indian judges
20th-century Indian lawyers
Living people